Saruni-ye Olya (also Romanized as Sarūnī-ye ‘Olyā; also known as Sarānī-ye Bālā) is a village in Eslamabad Rural District, in the Central District of Jiroft County, Kerman Province, Iran. At the 2006 census, its population was 201, in 45 families.

References 

Populated places in Jiroft County